Abdul Jabbar (born 1 March 1983) is a Canadian cricket player. He is a right-hand batsman and a right-arm medium pace bowler. He made his One-Day International debut for Canada on the tour to Kenya in October 2007. There, he appeared in two matches scoring 59 runs with a high score of 44 and averaging 29.50. He also was involved in two Intercontinental Cup matches against Kenya and Namibia scoring 70 runs with a high score of 49, averaging 17.50. His 49 came on his Intercontinental Cup debut against Kenya, contributing to Canada's first wicket partnership of 68.

References 

1983 births
Canada One Day International cricketers
Canadian cricketers
Living people
Pakistani emigrants to Canada
Naturalized citizens of Canada
Cricketers from Rawalpindi
Pakistani cricketers